The International School of Paphos was founded in 1987 as a co-educational day and boarding school located in Paphos, Cyprus. 

It is currently a day school, with boarding option, situated in Anavargos Village, on the outskirts of Paphos. New facilities were completed in 2006. The boarding house accommodates students of secondary school age (11 – 18). It currently has more than 800 students.

The key stages and classes

Subjects
The infants are offered classes such as Topic (science and geography), basic maths, English and many other subjects.

Juniors are offered even more subjects such as Art, History, Citizenship and more advanced maths. In year 5, Exams start. Juniors finish school at 1pm each day, unless they choose to do any recreational activities after school. Some of the after school clubs which are currently on offer are the scrabble club, badminton club, medical club and the drama club.

In senior school, three more subjects are added to the list. These are German, French and drama. At the end of year 7 students are allowed to choose what language to pursue in future years. Seniors finish at 2:15pm.

The school starts in the beginning of September, and finishes in the end of June. Exams usually begin at the beginning of June for years 5-10, and in the middle of May for years 11-13.

For the past two years, the school has given out scholarships awarding students from years 5 to 12 for high achievement in their end of year exams. Students can win up to 20% of their school fees.

International Examinations

==

Facilities
 1 cafeteria 
 A large sports hall
 Two outdoor basketball courts
 Indoor heated swimming pool
 Football field
 3 large playgrounds
 Library
 School shop
 Tennis court
 6 Science laboratories
 Theatrical stage
 Drama studio
Exam hall
Boarding house

Summer School
The International School of Paphos provides a Summer School for children aged 4-18.

Arts
Crafts
English Conversation
Reading
Writing
Role Play
Information Technology
Physical Education (including swimming, water polo, football, basketball, volleyball, rounders, handball, tennis, karate and hockey).

Sports
The International School of Paphos is an athletic school. They consider Physical Education an important subject, and therefore it is compulsory to do it twice a week. ISOP has taken place in many sport competitions such as the yearly Paphos cross country race, The Panpaphian, the Pancyprian and others. They award students from years 7-9 and 10-12 for sportmanship. They also encourage students to take part in many sports in school, such as rounders, football, rugby, basketball, swimming, badminton, tennis, volleyball, basketball, archery (year 10 and up) and much more.

References 

International schools in Cyprus
Cambridge schools in Cyprus
International high schools
1987 establishments in Cyprus
Educational institutions established in 1987